Flor Silvestre canta sus éxitos (Flor Silvestre Sings Her Hits) is a greatest hits album by Mexican singer Flor Silvestre, released in 1964 by Okeh Records. It features ten successful songs that the singer recorded  for Columbia Records in 1950. It was reissued in 2016 by Sony Music.

Track listing
Side one

Side two

Release history

References

External links
 Flor Silvestre canta sus éxitos at iTunes

1964 greatest hits albums
Flor Silvestre albums
Okeh Records albums
Spanish-language compilation albums